Martin Stein is a fictional character appearing in American comic books published by DC Comics. He is commonly associated with, and sometimes is, the superhero Firestorm.

Stein has made several appearances in DC-related media, such as the Arrowverse TV series The Flash and Legends of Tomorrow, in which he is portrayed by Victor Garber.

Publication history
He first appeared in Firestorm the Nuclear Man #1 (March 1978), and was created by Gerry Conway and Al Milgrom.

Fictional character biography
Nobel Prize-winning physicist Martin Stein was caught in an accident that allowed them to fuse into Firestorm the "Nuclear Man" with student Ronnie Raymond. Due to Stein being unconscious during the accident, Raymond was prominently in command of the Firestorm form with Stein a voice of reason inside his mind, able to offer Raymond advice on how to use their powers without actually having any control over their dual form. Banter between the two was a hallmark of their adventures. Stein was initially completely unaware of their dual identity, leaving him concerned about his unusual disappearances and blackouts, but Ronnie was eventually able to convince him of the truth, allowing them to bond as separate individuals rather than as parts of a whole.

After the accident, Firestorm took to defending New York City from such threats as Multiplex and Killer Frost. The 1982 series began with the teenaged Raymond adjusting to his newfound role and later delved into the issue of the nuclear arms race. The Fury of Firestorm slowly developed the lives of Raymond and Stein, as the teenager struggled with high school and moved towards graduation and the scientist found a life outside the lab after learning about his bond with Raymond. A second nuclear hero, Firehawk, was added as a love interest for Firestorm in 1984. In the same year, the character of Felicity Smoak was introduced, initially having a combative relationship with Raymond, but eventually being a step-mother following her marriage to Eddie Raymond. The series also tried to create a sense of fun, something that Gerry Conway felt was missing during his years writing Spider-Man;  the banter between Ronnie Raymond and Martin Stein contributed to this. Upon graduation from high school, Raymond entered college in Pittsburgh, where Stein had been hired as a professor. Afterward, together they searched for a cure for their bond.

When Conway left the series in 1986, John Ostrander (with artist Joe Brozowski) began writing the Firestorm stories. His first major story arc pitted Firestorm against the world, as the hero, acting on a suggestion from a terminally ill Professor Stein, demanded that the United States and the Soviet Union destroy all of their nuclear weapons. After confrontations with the Justice League and most of his enemies, Firestorm faced the Russian nuclear superhero Pozhar in the Nevada desert, where an atomic bomb was dropped on them. A new Firestorm resulted, a fusion of the two heroes: this new Firestorm was composed of Ronnie Raymond and the Russian Mikhail Arkadin but controlled by the disembodied amnesiac mind of Martin Stein.

The Firestorm with Arkadin proved to be a transitional phase, as in 1989 Ostrander fundamentally changed the character of Firestorm by revealing that Firestorm was a "Fire Elemental". Firestorm now became something of an environmental crusader, formed from Ronnie Raymond, Mikhail Arkadin and Svarozhich, a Soviet clone of the previous Firestorm, but with a new mind. Professor Stein, no longer part of the composite at all, continued to play a role, but the focus was on this radically different character. New artist Tom Mandrake would create a new look to match. It was during this phase that Firestorm met and befriended Sango and the Orishas, the elemental gods of Nigeria. He also met their chief deity and Sango's older brother Obatala, Lord of the White Cloth.

By the series' 100th issue, Stein learned that he was destined to be the true Fire Elemental and would have been were it not for Raymond also being there by circumstance. Raymond and Arkadin were returned to their old lives, and Stein as Firestorm was accidentally exiled to deep space in the process of saving the Earth. He thereafter spent many years traveling through space as a wanderer, returning to Earth only rarely.

In the 2006 miniseries Infinite Crisis, it was revealed that Martin Stein, alive in space as the "Elemental Firestorm", had sensed the presence of Jason Rusch within the Firestorm Matrix, but was unaware of Ronnie Raymond's final demise. When Jason, as Firestorm, was gravely wounded in the line of duty, Stein linked with him in a variation of the merge, promising Jason a new Firestorm body to let him return into battle, although Martin had been unable to save Mick Wong, and asking him about Ronnie's fate.

Accepting Martin's proposal, Jason asked Stein to become the permanent second member of the Firestorm Matrix. Sensing his "errors" (including Mick's death) were the result of his youth and lack of experience, he sought the experience and maturity of Stein. Stein refused at first, but later accepted Jason's request, thus ensuring both a new Firestorm body and the reconstruction of human bodies for both Rusch and Stein.

It was revealed in Infinite Crisis that if the Multiverse had survived up to the present, Jason would have been a native of Earth-Eight.

As the storyline jumped ahead one year (and the series itself was now retitled as Firestorm the Nuclear Man from issue #23 on), Professor Stein has mysteriously vanished, and Jason Rusch has been merging with Firehawk to become Firestorm, allowing him to use her powers as well. The two decided to look for Stein together. Stein had been kidnapped and tortured by the Pupil, a former teaching assistant of Stein's. Flanked by the D.O.L.L.I.s, a group of cyborg soldiers of limited cognitive ability, the Pupil (formerly known as Adrian Burroughs) questioned the nearly dead Stein about the secrets of the universe. Jason and Lorraine, along with the mysterious teleport-er Gehenna, freed the captured Stein and restored him to full health. 

The Firestorm team of Jason and Firehawk made several appearances across the DC Universe before the search for Martin Stein ended.

Jason Rusch and Martin Stein meet Shilo Norman, and are attacked in succession by members of the New Gods, such as Orion of New Genesis, Granny Goodness's Female Furies and a greatly augmented Kalibak of Apokolips. Shilo informs Stein and Rusch that one-quarter of the Life Equation is hidden within the Firestorm Matrix. The others are held by Earth's other three Elementals (possibly the Red Tornado, the Naiad, and the Swamp Thing). Darkseid fears that the Life Equation might challenge him and the Anti-Life Equation. Orion wished to keep Professor Stein safe, and Darksied's elite wished to secure the Matrix for Darkseid. The Lord of Evil descended upon them, ripped the professor from Rusch within the Firestorm Matrix, then vanished without a trace. Jason, with Gehenna as a "hidden partner" in their fusion, began his search for the missing Dr. Stein.

He returns in 2010–2011 Brightest Day miniseries, reuniting with resurrecting Ronnie Raymond without them being fused. While recovering in the hospital, Stein explains to Ronnie that it seems to be very dangerous to fuse into Firestorm again. Also, it is revealed that Ronnie, after quickly leaving the hospital and being threatened by Alvin Rusch to stay away from Jason, lied to everyone, as he seems to perfectly remember murdering Gehenna as a Black Lantern.

As Firestorm, both Ronnie and Jason visit Stein in an attempt to find out what is happening to them. Stein reveals to them that the Black Lantern Firestorm still exists in the Firestorm Matrix. Firestorm is then told by the Entity that they must learn from each other and defeat the Black Lantern Firestorm before he destroys the Entity. Somehow, Jason and Ronnie trade places.

After running a test, Professor Stein reveals the origin of the Firestorm Matrix. Stein believes that, during the initial experiment, he was able to capture the spark that preceded the Big Bang that created our universe, thereby making the Matrix a trigger for a new Big Bang. If the boys continue to experience emotional imbalance, they increase the likelihood of triggering a new Big Bang. After explaining this to the boys, the voice inside them speaks again. Declaring that it is not the Firestorm Matrix, a pair of black hands reaches out from inside Firestorm. Forcibly separating Jason and Ronnie, the Black Lantern Firestorm stands between them, separate from both Ronnie and Jason and apparently calling itself Deathstorm.

Deathstorm reveals its plan to Stein, stating that it intends to create enough emotional instability between Ronnie and Jason that the Matrix will trigger another Big Bang, thereby destroying all life in the universe. To help accomplish this goal, Deathstorm absorbs Stein's mind to use his knowledge of Ronnie against him.

Deathstorm and the Black Lanterns teleport to an unknown location, while Firestorm (Jason and Ronnie) ultimately seek the help from the Justice League. Firestorm arrives at the Hall of Justice asking for help. Firestorm is placed in a containment chamber while the League search for a way to stabilize the energy. However, an internal argument between Ronnie and Jason ignites the spark, apparently resulting in the destruction of the universe. Ronnie and Jason quickly notice, after defeating a hive of Shadow Demons, that the universe was not destroyed as they thought, but they were actually transported to the Anti-Matter Universe. There, they are contacted by the Entity, who reveals to them that, since Boston Brand has not yet found the one who will take the Entity's place, it is Firestorm's mission to protect the Entity. Meanwhile, Deathstorm and the Black Lanterns are shown on Qward delivering the White Lantern Battery to someone. That someone is revealed to be the Anti-Monitor, seeking to harvest the life energy within the Lantern to grow stronger. Firestorm takes the White Lantern and attempts to fight the Anti-Monitor, but is defeated. Deathstorm then brings Professor Stein out of his Matrix to taunt the two with. Deathstorm then attempts to turn Ronnie into table salt, but the Professor takes the brunt of the attack. Angered, Ronnie decides to truly work together with Jason to avenge the Professor. The Entity then declares that Ronnie has accomplished his mission, returning him to life in a burst of white energy that obliterates the Black Lanterns, returns Alvin to his home, and deposits Firestorm in the Star City forest. Ronnie angrily attempts to make the Entity resurrect the Professor, but is refused. Deadman then arrives, demanding that he be given the White Lantern Battery.

The New 52
After the events of the 2011 Flashpoint storyline, The New 52 reality altered Firestorm's personal history to the point of being completely restarted. Ronnie Raymond is now introduced as a high school senior and the captain of the football team. During a terrorist attack on their school, classmate Jason Rusch produces a vial given to him by Professor Stein, which contains the "God Particle", one of Stein's creations. The God Particle transforms both Jason and Ronnie into Firestorm, and the two teens briefly battle each other before accidentally merging into a hulking creature known as the Fury.

Sharing the identity of Firestorm, with Ronnie being the brawn and Jason being the brains, Firestorm is considered for recruitment into the Justice League along with several other heroes.

Other versions

Earth-3
The Earth-Three counterpart of Martin Stein is introduced in the "Trinity War" event as a part of Deathstorm, a member of the Crime Syndicate. This version of Stein experimented on humans to unlock the secret of life through death. He was recruited by one of the Crime Syndicate's enemies to determine what the Syndicate's individual weaknesses were. However, he used the new lab he was supplied with to continue his experiments before eventually experimenting on himself, fusing with a corpse, and becoming Deathstorm. He is killed by Mazahs, who then steals his powers.

In other media

Television

Animation
 Martin Stein appears in Super Friends: The Legendary Super Powers Show, voiced by Olan Soule.
 Martin Stein appears in The Super Powers Team: Galactic Guardians, voiced by Ken Sansom.
 Martin Stein was intended to appear in Justice League Unlimited, but the show's writers were unable to come up with a story that they liked.
 Martin Stein appears in Justice League Action, voiced by Stephen Tobolowsky.

Arrowverse

Martin Stein / Firestorm appears in media set in The CW's Arrowverse, portrayed by Victor Garber. This version developed the F.I.R.E.S.T.O.R.M. matrix until he was exposed to dark matter energy amidst the explosion of Harrison Wells' particle accelerator and presumed dead.
 Stein first appears in the live-action TV series The Flash. As a result of the explosion, Stein became fused with his matrix and Ronnie Raymond. Stein initially holds primary control over their fused form until Wells develops a way to safely separate them. Following this, Stein and Raymond master their powers and assist the Flash in fighting the Reverse-Flash until Raymond sacrifices himself to close a singularity that had opened over Central City. Afterward, Stein continues to assist Team Flash until the F.I.R.E.S.T.O.R.M. matrix begins to destabilize without a partner of the same blood type, endangering his life. Eventually, Team Flash find Stein's new partner in Jefferson "Jax" Jackson and the pair leave Central City to master their powers.
 Stein appears in the animated web series Vixen. 
 Stein appears in the live-action TV series Legends of Tomorrow, with Graeme McComb additionally portraying a younger version. In season one, he and Jax are recruited by Rip Hunter to join his Legends and defeat Vandal Savage. Amidst the team's mission, Stein is captured by and forcibly fused with Valentina Vostok, who intends to use his powers to create a Soviet Firestorm, but he is able to break free with Jax's help. By the season one finale, Stein and Jax develop the ability to transmute matter and use it to foil Savage's plot to undo history. In season two, Stein encounters his past self and inadvertently makes timeline changes that grant him a daughter named Lily Stein. Despite initially viewing Lily as a time paradox, he eventually comes to accept her. By season three, Stein has become a grandfather after Lily has a son named Ronnie, prompting Jax to ask their teammate Ray Palmer to develop a formula capable of separating the F.I.R.E.S.T.O.R.M. matrix so Stein can be with his family. During the events of the "Crisis on Earth-X" crossover, Stein is fatally injured while helping the Legends and Earth-1's heroes defeat Nazis from Earth-X, but drinks the formula to spare Jackson from suffering his fate, sacrificing himself in the process.

Video games
 The Martin Stein incarnation of Firestorm appears in Injustice 2, voiced by Fred Tatasciore. This version fuses with Jason Rusch and both are allies of Batman who help to restore order following the fall of Superman's Regime. In their arcade ending, Firestorm attempts to defeat Brainiac by overheating his Skull Ship's engines, but cause it to explode and destroy the collected worlds within. Though they know their allies will never look at them the same way again after their mistake, they still pledge to help Batman if needed.
 Two versions of Martin Stein, one who fuses with Jason Rusch to become Firestorm and his Earth-3 counterpart Deathstorm (voiced by Lex Lang), appear as playable characters in Lego DC Super-Villains.

References

External links
 Firestorm at Don Markstein's Toonopedia. Archived from the original on July 29, 2016.
 
 
 

1978 comics debuts
Articles about multiple fictional characters
Characters created by Al Milgrom
Characters created by Gerry Conway
Characters created by John Ostrander
Comics characters introduced in 1978
Comics by John Ostrander
DC Comics American superheroes
DC Comics characters with superhuman senses
DC Comics metahumans
DC Comics male superheroes
DC Comics scientists
DC Comics television characters
Fictional characters who can turn intangible
Fictional characters with eidetic memory
Fictional characters with absorption or parasitic abilities
Fictional characters with density control abilities
Fictional characters with elemental transmutation abilities
Fictional characters with fire or heat abilities
Fictional characters with nuclear or radiation abilities 
Fictional characters with energy-manipulation abilities
Fictional characters with X-ray vision
Fictional nuclear physicists
Merged fictional characters